Killin railway station was a railway station located at Killin, Stirling.

History 
Opened on 1 April 1886, the station comprised a single platform on the west side of the line. There were also three sidings on the same side.

A camping coach was positioned here by the Scottish Region from 1961 to 1963.

This station was officially closed on 1 November 1965, although following the Glen Ogle landslide on 27 September 1965, the service was suspended and replaced by buses until the official closure.

References

Sources 
 
 
 

Disused railway stations in Stirling (council area)
Beeching closures in Scotland
Railway stations in Great Britain opened in 1886
Railway stations in Great Britain closed in 1965